The HARID Conservatory is a ballet professional-training school for high-school age students. It was established in 1987 and is located in Boca Raton, Florida. A four-year curriculum is offered that includes ballet and related dance courses. Academic coursework is provided on campus through Florida Virtual School. HARID is recognized as a high school by the State of Florida. HARID additionally offered a four-year, tuition-free college music program from 1991 until 1999, when the music program was transferred to Lynn University.

The school's founder was Fred Lieberman (1923–2008), who named it for his parents Harry and Ida.  Although Lieberman funded the program's annual operating costs, he remained an anonymous benefactor during his lifetime, known only as "the Donor" to HARID students, employees, and supporters. He also established an endowment fund to continue funding the school after his death.

Notable alumni
Notable alumni of the Harid Conservatory include:

Class of 1990
 Amy Fote – Houston Ballet

Class of 1992
 Philip Pegler – The Royal Ballet School

Class of 1993
 Chalnessa Eames – Pacific Northwest Ballet
 Riolama Lorenzo – Pennsylvania Ballet
 Stacey Slichter – Atlanta Ballet

Class of 1994
 Joseph Jefferies – Les Ballets Trockadero de Monte Carlo

Class of 1995
 Lilyan Vigo Ellis – Carolina Ballet

Class of 1996
 Marcelo Gomes – American Ballet Theatre
 Robert Moore – Pittsburgh Ballet Theatre
 Sara Webb – Houston Ballet

Class of 1997
 James Sofranko – San Francisco Ballet
 Benjamin Stewart – San Francisco Ballet
 Matthew Stewart – San Francisco Ballet

Class of 1998
 Blair Puente – Alberta Ballet

Class of 1999
 Kathleen Breen Combes – Boston Ballet
 Joanna Wozniak – Joffrey Ballet

Class of 2000
 Sasha Edelman – Ballet Arizona
 Simone Messmer – American Ballet Theatre
 Joshua Grant – Les Ballets Trockadero de Monte Carlo

Class of 2001
 Robin Bangert – Texas Ballet Theater
 Bo Busby – Boston Ballet
 Ashley Laracey – New York City Ballet
 Elizabeth McGrath – Ballet West
 Sarah Smith – American Ballet Theatre
 Connor Walsh – Houston Ballet

Class of 2002
 Jonathan Dummar – Joffrey Ballet
 Bridgett Zehr – National Ballet of Canada, English National Ballet

Class of 2003
 Matthew Adamczyk – Joffrey Ballet
 Ludmila Campos – San Francisco Ballet
 Amanda Green – Royal Winnipeg Ballet

Class of 2004
 Andrew Brader – Los Angeles Ballet
 Sean Omandam – Colorado Ballet

Class of 2005
 Isabella Boylston – American Ballet Theatre
 James Clark – Royal Danish Ballet
 Heather Crosby – Texas Ballet Theater
 Lauren Post – American Ballet Theatre
 Hanae Seki – Tulsa Ballet
 Megan Steffens – Sacramento Ballet
 Gleidson Vasconcelos – New Jersey Ballet

Class of 2006
 Emily McLaughlin – Ballet Austin II
 Adam Still – Colorado Ballet

Class of 2007
 Chelsea Adomaitis – Pacific Northwest Ballet (apprentice)
 Isadora Loyola – American Ballet Theatre

Class of 2008
 Francisco Preciado – Ballet San Jose (apprentice)
 Kevin Wilson – Colorado Ballet Studio Company

Class of 2009
 Jaime DeRocker – Colorado Ballet Studio Company
 Andrew Hellerick – Texas Ballet Theater (trainee)
 Christophor Moulton – Colorado Ballet Studio Company
 Paige Nyman – Texas Ballet Theater (trainee)
 Emma Pressman – Texas Ballet Theater (trainee)

References

Ballet schools in the United States
Private high schools in Florida
Buildings and structures in Boca Raton, Florida
High schools in Palm Beach County, Florida
Educational institutions established in 1987
Dance in Florida
1987 establishments in Florida